Kamarang is an Amerindian village, standing at the confluence of the Kamarang River and Mazaruni River, in the Cuyuni-Mazaruni Region of Guyana.

Kamarang has a Primary School,  Hospital, Police station and can be accessed by air via the Kamarang Airport.

The village has seen extensive economic growth at the start of the 21st century because of gold and diamond mining, however as of 2019, the output has started to decline. Its altitude is 490 metres (1601 feet).

Demography 
According to the 2002 population census, it had 349 inhabitants.

References

Populated places in Cuyuni-Mazaruni
Indigenous villages in Guyana